The Calgary Flames are a professional hockey team based in Calgary, Alberta, Canada.  They are members of the Northwest Division of the Western Conference in the National Hockey League (NHL).  Since their arrival in 1980, nearly 400 players have worn the Flames jersey for at least one regular season or playoff game. The Flames have won the Stanley Cup once, in 1989, and four players have been elected into the Hockey Hall of Fame; the most recent electee is Jarome Iginla, who was enshrined in 2021.

Fourteen players have served as the captain  of the Calgary Flames, beginning with Brad Marsh in 1980–81.  Doug Risebrough, Jim Peplinski and Lanny McDonald served together as co-captains in the 1980s; the latter two led the Flames to the 1989 Stanley Cup. The team's longest serving player, is Jarome Iginla.  Iginla joined the Flames for the 1996 Stanley Cup playoffs and, as of 2013, is the Flames' all-time leader in games played, points and goals scored. Currently, the Flames captaincy is vacant, since the departure of Mark Giordano in 2021 to the Seattle Kraken, via expansion draft.

Key

Goaltenders

Note: Statistics are complete as of the end of the 2021–22 NHL season.

Skaters

Note: Statistics are complete as of the end of the 2021–22 NHL season.

References

Goaltenders: 
Skaters 
Captains 

 
Calgary
players